The 5th Annual Irish Film & Television Awards took place on 17 February 2008 at the Gaiety Theatre, Dublin, honouring Irish film and television released in 2007.

Film
Film
 Garage
 Becoming Jane
 Closing the Ring
 Kings
 Shrooms

International Film
 The Lives of Others
 Atonement
 The Bourne Ultimatum
 La Vie en Rose

Director Film
 Lenny Abrahamson – Garage
 Paddy Breathnach – Shrooms
 Tom Collins – Kings
 John Crowley – Boy A
 Robert Quinn – Cré na Cille

Script Film
 Mark O'Halloran – Garage
 Tom Collins – Kings
 Mark O'Rowe – Boy A
 Stuart Townsend – Battle in Seattle

Actor in a Lead Role Film
 Pat Shortt – Garage
 Gabriel Byrne – Jindabyne
 Colm Meaney – Kings
 Cillian Murphy – Sunshine
 Hugh O'Conor – Speed Dating

Actor in a Supporting Role Film
 Brendan Conroy – Kings
 Donal O'Kelly – Kings
 Conor J. Ryan – Garage
 Don Wycherley – Speed Dating

Actress in a Supporting Role Film
 Saoirse Ronan – Atonement
 Elaine Cassidy – And When Did You Last See Your Father
 Anne Marie Duff – Garage
 Gail Fitzpatrick – Strength and Honour

International Actor
 Daniel Day-Lewis – There Will Be Blood
 George Clooney – Michael Clayton
 James McAvoy – Atonement
 Ulrich Mühe – The Lives of Others

Television
Single Drama / Drama Serial
 The Running Mate
 Damage
 My Boy Jack
 Prosperity

Drama Series / Soap
 The Tudors
 The Clinic
 Ros na Rún
 Single-Handed

Director Television
 Lenny Abrahamson – Prosperity
 Brian Kirk – The Tudors
 Paul Mercier – Aifric
 Declan Recks – The Running Mate

Script Television
 Mark O'Halloran – Prosperity
 Marcus Fleming – The Running Mate
 Mark O'Halloran – Prosperity
 Daniel O'Hara – Paddy C.Courtney – Paddywhackery
 Aisling Walsh – Damage

Actor in a Lead Role Television
 Jonathan Rhys Meyers – The Tudors
 Denis Conway – The Running Mate
 Michael Gambon – Celebration
 Jonathan Rhys Meyers – The Tudors
 Don Wycherley – The Running Mate

Actor in a Supporting Role Television
 Nick Dunning – The Tudors
 Leroy Harris – Prosperity
 Eamonn Hunt – The Running Mate
 Gary Lydon – The Clinic

Actress in a Lead Role Film/Television
 Aisling O'Sullivan – The Clinic
 Clíona Ní Chiosáin – Aifric
 Fionnula Flanagan – Brotherhood
 Bríd Ní Neachtáin – Cré na Cille
 Siobhan Shanahan – Prosperity

Actress in a Supporting Role Television
 Maria Doyle Kennedy – The Tudors
 Dawn Bradfield – The Clinic
 Fionnula Flanagan – Paddywhackery
 Amy Huberman – The Clinic

Craft
Costume Design
 Joan Bergin – The Tudors
 Maggie Donnelly – Kings
Lorna Marie Mugan – My Boy Jack
Eimer Ní Mhaoldomhnaigh – Becoming Jane

Director of Photography
 Seamus McGarvey – Atonement
 PJ Dillon – Kings
 Seamus McGarvey – Atonement
 Peter Robertson  – Garage
 Ciaran Tanham – Northanger Abbey

Editing
 Dermot Diskin – Kings
 Stephen O'Connell – Damage
 Isobel Stephenson – Garage
 Gareth Young – The Running Mate

Hair & Makeup
 Jennifer Hegarty, Dee Corcoran – The Tudors
 Kings – Muriel Bell, Pamela Smyth
 My Boy Jack – Morna Ferguson, Lorraine Glynn
 Prosperity – Tom McInerney, Sandra Kelly

Original Score
 Pol Brennan – Kings
 Jim Lockhart – Cré na Cille
 Stephen McKeon – The Running Mate
 Stephen Rennicks – Garage

Production Design
 Tom Conroy – The Tudors
 David Craig – Kings
 Tom Mc Cullagh – Closing the Ring
 Padraig O'Neill – Garage

Sound
 Ken Galvin, Ronan Hill, Dominic Weaver – Kings
 Becoming Jane – Nick Adams, Tom Johnson, Mervyn Moore
 Garage – Niall Brady, John Fitzgerald, Robert Flanagan
 My Boy Jack – Brendan Deasy, Ken Galvin, Nikki Moss

Other television
Children's / Youth Programme
 Skunk Fu!
 Aifric
 The Café
 Cúla Cairde

Current Affairs Programme
  Prime Time Investigates – Not Seen, Not Heard
 Election 2007 – Results Coverage
 Time Investigates – Buyer Beware
  Prime Time Investigates – Not Seen, Not Heard
 Spotlight: The Pitbull Sting

Documentary Series
 The Hospice
 Imeacht Na N'Iarlaí /Flight of The Earls
 Mobs Mheirceá
 Scannal
 Surgeons

Single Documentary
 At Home with the Clearys
 Arts Lives: The Undertaking 
 Bloody Sunday – A Derry Diary 
 Get Collins 
 Ireland's Nazis
 Joe Strummer: The Future is Unwritten

Entertainment
 The Podge & Rodge Show
 Dan & Becs
 Killinaskully
 Naked Camera

Factual Entertainment
 Diarmuid's Pony Kids
 Families in Trouble
 Hector – Mo Rogha San Oz
 No Experience Required

News Programme
 BBC Newsline
 Nuacht RTÉ/TG4
 RTÉ News
 TV3 News @ 5.30

Sport
 Tall, Dark & Ó hAilpín
 20 Moments That Shook Irish Sport
 Red Mist
 Rugby World Cup 2007
 Six Nations: Ireland's v England

Other awards
Special Irish Language Award
 Kings
 Aifric
 Cré na Cille
 Paddywhackery

Irish Film Board Rising Star 2008
 Saoirse Ronan – Actress
 Cecelia Ahern – Writer
 Mark Mahon – Producer
 Martin McCann – Actor
 Marian Quinn – Director

Animation
 Skunk Fu!
 Ding Dong Denny O'Reilly's History of Ireland
 The Ugly Duckling and Me
 Wobblyland

Short Film
 New Boy
 Deep Breaths
 Hesitation
 No Regrets
 The Wednesdays

Pantene People's Choice Award for Best International Actress
 Hilary Swank – P.S. I Love You
 Cate Blanchett – Elizabeth: The Golden Age
 Jodie Foster – The Brave One
 Keira Knightley – Atonement

Sony Bravia TV Personality of the Year
 Kathryn Thomas – RTÉ
 Stephen Nolan
 Michelle Doherty – Channel 6
 Kathy Hoffman – City Channel
 Paul Dempsey – Setanta Sports
 Síle Ní Bhraonáin – TG4
 Lorraine Keane – TV3
 Julian Simmons – UTV

Outstanding Contribution to World Cinema
 Mel Gibson

References

 

2008 in Irish television
5